The 1971 Maine Black Bears football team was an American football team that represented the University of Maine as a member of the Yankee Conference during the 1971 NCAA College Division football season. In its fifth season under head coach Walter Abbott, the team compiled a 2–6 record (1–4 against conference opponents) and finished last in the Yankee Conference. William Swadel and Stanley Maddock were the team captains.

Schedule

References

Maine
Maine Black Bears football seasons
Maine Black Bears football